Pop-Tarts is a brand of toaster pastries produced and distributed by Kellogg's since 1964, consisting of a sweet filling sealed inside two layers of thin, rectangular pastry crust. Most varieties are also frosted. Although sold pre-cooked, they are designed to be warmed inside a toaster or microwave oven. They are usually sold in pairs inside Mylar (previously foil) packages and do not require refrigeration.

Pop-Tarts is Kellogg's most popular brand to date in the United States, with millions of units sold each year. They are distributed mainly in the United States, but are also available in Canada, the United Kingdom, Ireland, Australia and New Zealand.

Pop-Tarts are produced in dozens of flavors, plus various one-time, seasonal, and "limited edition" flavors that appear for a short time.

History 

In the early 1960s, Post invented a process for dehydrating food and enclosing it in foil to keep it fresh — first used for dog food — and adapted it to its new toaster-prepared breakfast pastry.  Intended to complement its cold cereals, Post announced its new product to the press in 1964 before they went to market, calling them "Country Squares".

Because Post had revealed Country Squares before they were ready for the marketplace, their biggest competitor, Kellogg, was able to develop its version in six months. Initially called Fruit Scones, the name was soon changed to Pop-Tarts as a pun on the then popular Pop Art movement. The product, advertised by an animated, anthropomorphic toaster named Milton, became so popular that Kellogg could not keep up with demand. The first shipment of Pop-Tarts to stores sold out in two weeks, and Kellogg's ran advertisements apologizing for the empty shelves. This only increased demand for the new product.

The first Pop-Tarts came in four flavors: strawberry, blueberry, brown sugar cinnamon, and apple currant, which was soon renamed apple-berry. Originally unfrosted when first introduced in 1964, it was later determined that frosting could withstand the toaster, and the first frosted Pop-Tarts were released in 1967.  As of 2021, there are over 20 standard Pop-Tart flavors, including hot fudge sundae, s'mores, raspberry, and grape.

Pop-Tarts were introduced with fairly substantial marketing to the United Kingdom in the early 1990s. Chocotastic and Strawberry Sensation are available in most major UK supermarkets.

The United States military airdropped 2.4 million Pop-Tarts in Afghanistan during the initial attack in 2001.

A temporary Pop-Tarts store opened in New York City in 2010; it was operational until December 31 that year.

, sales of Pop-Tarts had increased for 32 straight years.

Products

Kellogg's keeps between 20 and 30 flavors in production at any time, and is constantly testing and trying new flavors to meet shifting consumer tastes.

Standard flavors
Pop Tart's core flavors have been unchanged for over 30 years and include favorites such as frosted strawberry and brown sugar cinnamon. In addition, Kellogg's is constantly introducing new flavors into regular production and removing ones that don't sell well. In 2020, they introduced three new Pretzel flavors while ceasing production of most of the 'wild' flavor line.

Seasonal flavors
Kellogg's produces some flavors for a short time every year, to coincide with seasonal or holiday events. Some examples include Pumpkin Pie, released every Fall since 2011, and Red White and Blueberry, brought back every Summer since 2012.

Limited flavors
Limited flavors are produced for a short time, a few months or less, and usually have a "Limited Edition" banner on the box. They are sometimes made in cooperation with another food brand. Dunkin Donuts, Jolly Rancher, and A&W Root Beer have collaborated with Kellogg's to create limited-edition branded Pop-Tart flavors. They have also worked with other Kellogg's brands to make Froot Loops and Eggo flavored Pop-Tarts.

Occasionally a limited flavor will sell so well that Kellogg's will keep producing it longer or make it a regular flavor. Red Velvet was initially released as a limited flavor in 2013, but sold so well that it was kept in production until 2017 and returned as a standard flavor in 2021.

At least one flavor, Mister-E, was discontinued shortly after its two-month marketing in Summer 2021 as Kellogg’s pulled the plug on the flavor after receiving numerous complaints. It was confirmed to be known as "Everything Bagel" on the Pop-Tart website prior to its conclusion.

Outside the United States
A much more limited number of flavors are available outside the US. This is due to local laws that may prohibit the use of specific food dyes, or the use of high fructose corn syrup.

Only three flavors are available in Europe:
 Frosted Apple Blast
 Frosted Chocotastic 
 Frosted Strawberry Sensation

Related products
Presto Pizza was a pizza flavored toaster pastry produced by Kelloggs in 1971, and retired less than a year later.

Pastry Swirls were introduced in the mid-1990s and were similar to a competitor Pillsbury's Toaster Strudels. Pastry Swirls were bigger and thicker than regular Pop-Tarts and had less icing. Flavors included Cherry Cheese Danish and Cinnamon Cream. Sales were disappointing, and the products were discontinued in 2001.

Snak-Stix, a portable break-apart version intended as an after-school snack for children, was introduced in 2002. The new product was launched with a massive media tie-in with the American Idol TV show and live tour. It did not sell well and was discontinued a year later.

Go-Tarts was another attempt at a snack-sized product, released in 2006. These were thicker, narrow, and wrapped individually (instead of in packages of two). Go-Tarts were discontinued in 2008.

Mini Crisps was introduced in 2011. as a bite-sized, cracker-like pastry with no filling. They originally sold in 60-calorie pouches but were discontinued after poor sales. They were brought back in a larger size in 2018, as Pop Tart Crisps. The newer version is a larger bar-sized crispy pastry with filling and frosting.

Pop-Tarts Bites are a smaller, bite-sized version sold in pouches. They were originally introduced in 1994 but ceased production the next year. Kellogg's brought them back in 2018 in Frosted Strawberry and Brown Sugar Cinnamon flavors and has announced plans to expand to more flavors.

Pop Tarts Cereal was originally made in 1994, and sold through the early 2000s. Kellogg's brought it back in 2019 with two flavors: strawberry and brown sugar cinnamon.

In popular culture
In June 2021, Jerry Seinfeld announced he would produce and star in a movie about the creation of the Pop-Tart. The film, "Unfrosted: The Pop Tart Story", will be released on Netflix in 2023.

The History Channel series, The Food That Built America, has two episodes that include Pop Tarts. The first episode of the first season includes the rivalry between the Kellogg and Post companies, and mentions the invention of the Pop-Tart. The first episode of season four goes into more detail about the creation of the Pop Tart and the rival Country Squares from Post. 

The TV Show Family Guy featured a song about Pop-Tarts, and how good they taste with butter.

Homemade Pop-Tarts

Various recipes for homemade versions of Pop-Tarts have appeared online and in local coffee shops and bakeries. The recipes claim to be healthier, taste better than the mass-produced version, and are more versatile with the filling ingredients.

Advertising 

Industry trade groups have raised issues with Pop-Tarts advertising. In 2003, the Produce for Better Health Foundation (PBH) and the United Fresh Fruit and Vegetable Association told the Food and Drug Administration's Obesity Working Group that:

Pop-Tarts introduced a new advertising campaign, "Crazy Good", in 2004.  Characters that appeared often were a singing lizard and a group of children, dubbed "crazy-good kids", who commonly frightened the Pop-Tarts and caused them to be eaten or chased away. The sound design and signature "TaDa" opening and closings were created by Kamen Entertainment Group, Inc. The ads employ squiggly animation, surrealist humor, and non sequitur, all of which bear a strong resemblance to the signature work of animator Don Hertzfeldt. One "crazy-good kid" in particular bears strong resemblance to Billy in Hertzfeldt's Billy's Balloon. However, Hertzfeldt was not involved in any way with these advertisements and in 2006 was considering possible litigation for stealing his work.

In 2006, the Children's Advertising Review Unit (CARU) of the Council of Better Business Bureaus, prompted by a customer complaint, "recommended that Kellogg modify packaging, eliminate the phrase 'made with real fruit'."  Kellogg agreed to do so, and redesigned packages for the Pop-Tarts line accordingly; they assured CARU that the "claim does not appear on television or print advertising" and offered to "participate in CARU's self-regulatory process" and "take CARU's focus areas into consideration" as Kellogg proceeds with its "future child-directed advertising."

Cable in the Classroom has used a Pop-Tarts television commercial as an example in its media literacy program for children. They ask adults to watch a Pop-Tarts commercial with their children or students and "have them look at how much product information is presented and how much is really about lifestyle or attitude."

Lawsuits 
Thomas Nangle filed a lawsuit in 1992, suing Kellogg for damages after his Pop-Tart became stuck in his toaster and caught fire. The case gained wider notoriety when humorist Dave Barry wrote a column about starting a fire in his own toaster with Pop-Tarts. The discovery triggered a flurry of lawsuits. Since then, Pop-Tarts carry the warning: "Due to possible risk of fire, never leave your toasting appliance or microwave unattended."

In October 2021, a woman in New York sued Kellogg's for $5 million over what she claimed was misleading advertising about Strawberry Pop-Tarts. Her suit alleged, "The strawberry representations are misleading because the Product has less strawberries than consumers expect based on the labeling." This lawsuit was dismissed in March 2022, with US District Judge Marvin Aspin writing "The word 'Strawberry,' combined with a picture of half of a strawberry and a Pop-Tart oozing red filling, does not guarantee that there will be a certain amount of strawberries in the product's filling,"

Recalls

Pop-Tarts have been the subject of recalls when mislabeling could lead to serious allergic reactions. On August 4, 1995, it was announced that 94,500 cartons of Smucker's Real Fruit Frosted Strawberry pastries actually contained the Chocolate Fudge variety. In 2002, Kellogg alerted the public that egg was an undeclared ingredient in its Frosted Brown Sugar Cinnamon Pop-Tarts. In 2006, they alerted the public that some Frosted Blueberry Pop-Tarts contained milk as an undeclared ingredient.

See also 

 Convenience food
 Junk food
 Pastries

References

External links 

 

Brand name snack foods
Pastries
Kellogg's brands
Products introduced in 1964
Convenience foods
American snack foods